Serratia marcescens nuclease (endonuclease (Serratia marcescens), barley nuclease, plant nuclease I, nucleate endonuclease) is an enzyme. This enzyme catalyses the following chemical reaction

 Endonucleolytic cleavage to 5'-phosphomononucleotide and 5'-phosphooligonucleotide end-products

Hydrolyses double- or single-stranded substrate. It is a representative of the DNA/RNA non-specific endonuclease family.

References

External links 
 
 Serratia marcescens endonuclease at Protean Ltd., highly active

EC 3.1.30
Nucleases